People Get Ready: The Curtis Mayfield Story is a three-disc box set compilation album by Curtis Mayfield. It covers his entire career up to 1996 (New World Order, Mayfield's last album, was released in 1997), including several songs from his tenure with The Impressions (tracks 1-12 on the first disc). It was released on Curtom on February 27, 1996.

Track listing

References

Curtis Mayfield compilation albums
1996 compilation albums